The Himalayans (1974–1981) was a Nepali pop rock band based in Hong Kong. The band is best known for their songs such as  Musu Musu Hasi Deu and Gajalu le Akhai Chopney. The band was formed by some Nepali speaking British Gurkha soldiers in 1974 in Hong Kong and was disbanded in 1981, when some of the band members were transferred to a regiment in the UK.

Formation 
The band was formed in 1974. Norden Tenzin Bhutia was enlisted in British Gurkha army in Hong Kong in 1971. There he alongside fellow soldiers form the 7th Duke of Edinburgh's Own Gurkha Rifles formed the band in 1974. They started singing with some second hand instruments they had bought in Hong Kong for their band. Bhutia named the band The Himalayans because although the band members were from different places, Himalayas was the common link between them. The band members used to practice during evening time.

Gajalu le Akhai Chopney 
Initially, the band used to perform cover songs at various occasion in the regiment. In 1975/1976, when BFBS radio called them to record a song, they recorded their first original Gajalu le Akhai Chopney, which belonged to Bhutia's friend Arun Thapa. The song propelled them into mainstream Nepali music. After which they composed many original songs.

Musu Musu Hasi Deu 
Their song Musu Musu Hasi Deu was recreated by musicians Vishal Dadlani, Shiraz Bhattacharya and Samrat for the Bollywood film Pyaar Mein Kabhi Kabhi in 1999. According to band member Franklin Mukhiya, the recreation was unofficial and the song was plagiarized.

Members

Main members 
 Norden Tenzin Bhutia (Vocalist)
 Bijay Thapa (Guitar)
 Franklin Mukhia (Vocalist)
 Nawin Rai (Guitar)
 Sonam Tshering Sherpa (Drum)
 Deepak Chandra Rai (Drum)

Supporting members 

 Azal Singh Gurung
 Shyam Lama
 Krishnamilan Newar

Discography 

 Gajalu le Akhai Chopney
 Mayale Maya Gasideu
 Chiso Batasle
 Chanp Gurans Jab Phuldachha
 Malai Dherai Dherai 
 Kaha Timro Mayalu Lai
 Pharki Hera Mero Jeewan
 Musu Musu Hasi Deu

References 

Himalayans, The
Himalayans, The
Himalayans, The